Mansa Uli II (French: "Ouli II"), also known as Gbèré, was the twentieth mansa ("king of kings") of the Mali Empire.  He ruled during the later half of the 15th century.

According to the oral traditions preserved in Dioma, Gbèré was the younger of two brothers from Niani who liberated Dioma from a Fula invasion.  Gbèré is a Mandinka name meaning "red" in reference to one's skin tone.  After this success, his brother was crowned mansa.  Gbèré ascended to the throne under the royal name Uli II following his brother's death.

Portuguese contact
Beginning in the 1450s, Portugal began sending raiding parties along the Gambian coast for exploration as well as exploitation of its natural resources (products as well as people). What is now the Gambia, then known to Mali as the Tinkuru (province) or Bati, was still firmly in imperial hands.  The raiding expeditions ended in disaster for the Portuguese with many killed by poison arrows.  Portugal's Diogo Gomes sought more peaceable relations with the people of the coast and established contact with the Mali Empire. Other European explorers, such as the Venetian explorer Alvise Cadamosto, also recorded contact with a still-powerful Mali Empire along the coast in 1454.

See also
Mali Empire
Keita Dynasty

Mansas of Mali
People of the Mali Empire
15th-century monarchs in Africa
Keita family